Pierce Township is one of nineteen townships in DeKalb County, Illinois, United States. As of the 2010 census, its population was 454 and it contained 187 housing units. Pierce Township was formed from Squaw Grove and Pampas Township before 1853.

Geography

Cities, towns, villages
 Maple Park (partial)

Cemeteries
 Community Methodist
 Saint Marys

Demographics

School districts
 DeKalb Community Unit School District 428
 Hinckley-Big Rock Community Unit School District 429
 Indian Creek Community Unit District 425
 Kaneland Community Unit School District 302

Political districts
 Illinois's 14th congressional district
 State House District 70
 State Senate District 35

References
 
 US Census Bureau 2009 TIGER/Line Shapefiles
 US National Atlas

External links
 City-Data.com
 Illinois State Archives
 Township Officials of Illinois
 DeKalb County Official Site

Townships in DeKalb County, Illinois
Townships in Illinois